Keough is a surname from Ireland. Notable with the name include:

 Donald Keough (1926–2015), American business manager
 Francis Patrick Keough (1890–1961), American religious leader
 Harry Keough (1927–2012), American soccer player
 Jake Keough (born 1987), American cyclist
 Jeana Keough (born 1955), American model and actress
 Joe Keough (born 1946), American baseball right fielder
 Klancie Keough (born 1982), Australian musician
 Lavina Keough (born [?]), All-American Girls Professional Baseball League player 
 Luke Keough (born 1991), American cyclist
 Mark Keough (born 1953), American religious leader and politician
 Matt Keough (1955–2020), American baseball pitcher
 Riley Keough (born 1989), American actress and model
 Shawn Keough (born 1959), American politician

See also

Kehoe (surname)
Keogh (surname)
Keoghan (surname)
Keohane (disambiguation)
McKeogh
McKeough (disambiguation)

Surnames of Irish origin